The Essential Billy Joel is a Sony music compilation of songs by American singer/songwriter Billy Joel. It was released on October 2, 2001, and has been certified Triple Platinum by the RIAA. In conjunction with the release of the album, The Essential Video Collection was released, comprising Joel's most popular music videos.

On August 26, 2008, The Essential 3.0 was released containing a third disc with seven additional tracks.

Track listing
All songs written by Billy Joel.

Disc one

Disc two

Disc three

Chart performance

Weekly charts

Year-end charts

Certifications

}
}
}

References

Billy Joel compilation albums
2001 greatest hits albums
Sony BMG compilation albums
Albums produced by Michael Stewart (musician)
Albums produced by Phil Ramone
Albums produced by Mick Jones (Foreigner)
Albums produced by Danny Kortchmar